"She Couldn't Love Me Anymore" is a song written by Mike McGuire, Billy Henderson and Billy Maddox, and recorded by American country music artist T. Graham Brown.  It was released in September 1987 as the second single from the album Brilliant Conversationalist.  Co-writer Mike McGuire is the drummer and founding member of the country music group Shenandoah.  The song reached number 4 on the Billboard Hot Country Singles & Tracks chart.

Chart performance

References

1987 singles
1987 songs
T. Graham Brown songs
Capitol Records Nashville singles